The Nicholas Chain Bridge (or Nikolaevsky Chain Bridge;) was a chain bridge over the Dnieper that existed from 1855 to 1920 in Kyiv.

Overview

The bridge was designed by British engineer Charles Blacker Vignoles. Construction started in 1848 and was completed in 1853. The  bridge was the largest at that time in Europe. A silver model of the bridge was presented at The Great Exhibition in London.

In 1920, during the Polish-Soviet War, the bridge was blown up by retreating Polish troops. It was restored based on old drawings by Evgeny Paton and opened again in 1925 under the name Yevgenia Bosch Bridge. Paton had significantly changed its structure and raised it by several metres, so that the Yevgenia Bosch Bridge may be considered as a new bridge.

On 19 September 1941, Yevgenia Bosch Bridge was demolished by retreating Soviet troops and was never restored after the war. In 1965 in place of the former chain bridge a new Kyiv Metro Bridge was built.

See also
 Bridges in Kyiv

External links

 Chain bridge history and old photos on Kiev History Site
 Цветное изображение моста
 https://web.archive.org/web/20071222120927/http://pk.kiev.ua/history/2006/07/25/090056.html
 https://web.archive.org/web/20040203060952/http://www.k-telegraph.kiev.ua/N72/starygor.htm
 http://www.nostalgia2.kiev.ua/history-kiev_008.shtml

Demolished bridges in Ukraine
Former road bridges in Ukraine
Road bridges in Kyiv
Chain bridges
Suspension bridges in Ukraine
Bridges completed in 1855
Demolished buildings and structures in Kyiv